Ted Taylor may refer to:
Ted Taylor (physicist) (1925–2004), Theodore Taylor
Ted Taylor (footballer) (1887–1956), Edward Taylor
Ted Taylor (ice hockey) (born 1942)
Edward C. Taylor (1923–2017), American chemist
Ted Taylor (singer) (1934–1987), American R&B and soul singer
Teddy B. Taylor (born 1953), U.S. diplomat, United States Ambassador to Papua New Guinea, accredited to Solomon Islands, Vanuatu

See also
Teddy Taylor (1937–2017), Edward Taylor, British politician
Theodore Taylor (disambiguation)
Edward Taylor (disambiguation)
Ed Taylor (disambiguation)
Edwin Taylor (disambiguation)